Chester E. Hynes was an American football coach.  He served as the head football coach at Arkansas Agricultural, Mechanical & Normal College (Arkansas AM&N)—now known as University of Arkansas at Pine Bluff—for two seasons, from to 1944 to 1945, compiling a record of 3–13.

Head coaching record

References

Year of birth missing
Year of death missing
Arkansas–Pine Bluff Golden Lions football coaches